Glenorchy Cricket Club (GCC) also known as the "Magpies" represent Glenorchy in Tasmania's Premier Grade Cricket Competition.

Glenorchy Cricket Club was founded in 1931 and were at their most dominant in the 1950s, when they won a "four-in-a-row".
GCC have won 16 Cricket Tasmania Premier League Premierships and a record 32 Club Championships. Glenorchy's most recent success was the back to back Premier League Club Championships 2012-13 & 2013–14, back to back 1st grade premierships 2012-13 & 2013–14, Kookaburra Cup 2014–15, CTPL & Statewide T20 titles 2013–14.

Honours
TCA/ Cricket Tasmania Premier League Premierships: (16) 1941–42,1942–43,1948–49,1950–51,1951–52,1952–53,1953–54,1955–56,1956–57,1960–61,1962–63,1973–74,1975–76,1976–77, 2012–13, 2013–14.

External links
 GCC Website

1931 establishments in Australia
Cricket clubs established in 1931
Tasmanian grade cricket clubs
Sport in Hobart
Glenorchy, Tasmania